Glitch is a 2022 South Korean streaming television series directed by Roh Deok and written by Gin Han-sai. Starring Jeon Yeo-been and Nana, it tells the story of a young woman who tries to track down her missing boyfriend with the help of a UFO-watching club. The show was released on 7 October 2022 on Netflix.

Synopsis
Hong Ji-hyo comes from a rich family. She has a steady job, obtained through family connections. One night, her boyfriend of four years suddenly disappears. As she goes in search of him, she tries to uncover the truth behind a mysterious secret with the help of a community of UFO watchers, including Heo Bo-ra.

Cast and characters

Main
 Jeon Yeo-been as Hong Ji-hyo
 Shin Rin-ah as young Hong Ji-hyo
 Nana as Heo Bo-ra
 Jo Ye-rin as young Heo Bo-ra

Supporting
 Lee Dong-hwi as Lee Si-kook, Hong Ji-hyo's boyfriend
 Jeon Bae-soo as Hong Jong-sik, Hong Ji-hyo's father
 Ryu Kyung-soo as Kim Byung-jo, a police officer
 Lee Min-goo as Dong-hyuk, a high school student and a member of the UFO community
 Park Won-seok as Cho Phillip, a member of the UFO community
 Tae Won-suk as Captain Prince, a member of the UFO community 
 Baek Joo-hee as Seo Hwa-jeong, Value Real Estate
 Jung Da-bin as Kim Young-gi, New Beginnings Peace Corps
 Ko Chang-seok as Kim Chan-woo, Divine Light Church member
 Kim Ja-young
 Kim Gook-hee as Goo Hye-yeon, stepmother of Ji-hyo
 Park Soo-young as Kwon Young-woong
 Kim Nam-hee as Ma Hyung-woo, a psychiatrist who helps Ji-hyo
 Choi Soo-im as Oh Se-hee, Hong Ji-hyo's friend.
 Park Sung-yeon as Choi Seong-joo, former police officer

Production

Development
On 30 December 2020, Netflix confirmed through a press release that it would distribute a Korean original series titled Glitch, to be produced by Studio 329 and written by Extracurricular writer, Gin Han-sai.

Jeon Yeo-been was offered the lead role in early March. In mid-March, director Roh Deok and Jeon Yeo-been confirmed they had joined the series. On 19 March 2021, Nana was confirmed to play the role of a twitch streamer on the show.

Filming
On 23 July 2021, filming was temporarily halted due to the COVID-19 pandemic and one of the performers possibly being infected. Filming resumed on 21 May 2021 and continued until 23 December. On 28 May 2021, images from a script-reading location were revealed.

Episodes

Release
The series had its premiere at the 27th Busan International Film Festival, in the 'On Screen' section, on 6 October 2022. Four episodes out of ten were introduced in the premiere. It became available for streaming on Netflix on 7 October 2022.

Awards and nominations

References

External links
 
 
 
 
 Glitch at Daum 

Korean-language Netflix original programming
2022 South Korean television series debuts
South Korean science fiction television series
South Korean mystery television series
South Korean thriller television series
Television productions suspended due to the COVID-19 pandemic